The Battle of Mokuʻōhai, fought in 1782 on the island of Hawaiʻi, was a key battle in the early days of Kamehameha I's wars to conquer the Hawaiian Islands. It was his first major victory, solidifying his leadership over much of the island.

Background 

After King Kalaniʻōpuʻu died in the spring of 1782, his family took his remains to the royal mausoleum known as Hale o Keawe at the important religious temple Puʻuhonua o Hōnaunau. While Kalaniʻōpuʻu's son Kīwalaʻō had inherited the kingdom, his nephew Kamehameha was given a religious position, as well as the district of Waipiʻo valley. When a group of chiefs from the Kona district, including his brothers and uncles, Keaweaheulu, twins Kamanawa and Kameʻeiamoku, and Keʻeaumoku Pāpaʻiaheahe, offered to back Kamehameha instead of Kiwalaʻo, he accepted eagerly, traveling back from his residence in Kohala.

Kīwalaʻō's half-brother Keōua Kūʻahuʻula had been left with no territory from his late father.
He went into a rage, cutting down sacred coconut trees belonging to Kamehameha (considered a great insult) and killing some of Kamehameha's men.
Their bodies were offered as a sacrifice to Kīwalaʻō, who accepted them, and Kamehameha felt he had to respond to the challenge to his honor.

Battle 

The battleground was just to the south of Kealakekua Bay, near the present-day community called Keʻei., on the bay now called Mokuʻakae (which could be a misspelling of Mokuʻōhai), South of Palemano point. The name means "grove of ʻōhai trees". The tree, Sesbania tomentosa, is now endangered, and no longer grows in the area, so the site is only known from oral history.

As tensions were building, women and children from both sides flooded into the "place of refuge", Puʻuhonua o Hōnaunau.
Kameʻeiamoku was the first leader injured, but when Kīwalaʻō approached, Kamanawa came to his aid. Then Kīwalaʻō was knocked down by a sling stone, and the injured Kameʻeiamoku was able to slit his throat with a shark-tooth dagger.
It was during this battle that the renowned red feather cloak of Kīwalaʻō (now in the Bishop Museum) was captured by Kamehameha the Great.

Aftermath 
 
Keawemaʻuhili (uncle of Kīwalaʻō) was captured but escaped to Hilo, and Keōua Kūʻahuʻula fled to Kaʻū where he had relatives.
After the battle, Kamehameha controlled the Northern and Western parts of the Big Island, including Kona, Kohala, and Hāmākua while Keawemaʻuhili controlled Hilo and Kīwalaʻō's half-brother Keōua Kūʻahuʻula controlled Kaʻū.
Kamehameha fought several more battles over many years to consolidate his control. In 1790, Keōua's party was to have their footprints frozen into volcanic ash, and in 1791 Kamehameha's forces finally killed Keōua at Puʻukoholā Heiau.

References 

Battles involving Hawaii
History of Hawaii (island)
Ancient Hawaii
Conflicts in 1782
1782 in Hawaii
Wars of succession involving the states and peoples of Oceania